Bent Sæther (born 18 February 1969 in Oslo, Norway) is the bass guitarist and lead vocalist of the Norwegian psychedelic rock band Motorpsycho from the start in 1989.

Background 

 Sæther grew up in an apartment complex in Ammerud before moving to the more rural Ski, and to the family farm in Snåsa in Nord-Trøndelag at ten. He went to high school in Steinkjer, and attended the Norges Teknisk-Naturvitenskapelige Universitet in Trondheim, taking university courses in English and Social anthropology completing the former.

Career 
In 1989 he started Motorpsycho with Hans Magnus Ryan and Kjell Runar "Killer" Jenssen. He also started the country rock band The International Tussler Society in 1993. 2012 saw Bent Sæther as producer for three Norwegian records, two of which are considered two of Norway's "four great" rock bands; deLillos' 
Vi er på vei, vi kanke snu and DumDum Boys Ti Liv. In addition, he produced the self-titled debut album of the country rock band The South.

Honors 
Spellemannprisen 1996 in the class Rock, within Motorpsycho for the album Blissard
Spellemannprisen 1997 in the class Hardrock, within Motorpsycho for the album Angels and Daemons at Play
Spellemannprisen 2000 in the class Rock, within Motorpsycho for the album Let Them Eat Cake
Edvard Prize 2010 for the album Child of the Future

Discography

Motorpsycho albums 
1991: Lobotomizer (Voices of Wonder Records)
1992: 8 Soothing Songs For Rut (Voices of Wonder Records)
1993: Demon Box (Voices of Wonder Records)
1994: Timothy's Monster (Stickman Records)
1994: The Tussler
1995: Blissard (Stickman Records)
1997: Angels and Daemons at Play (Stickman Records)
1998: Trust Us (Stickman Records)
2000: Let Them Eat Cake (Columbia)
2001: Phanerothyme (Columbia)
2002: It's A Love Cult (Stickman Records)
2006: Black Hole/Blank Canvas 
2008: Little Lucid Moments
2009: Child of the Future 
2010: Heavy Metal Fruit
2013: Still Life With Eggplant
2014: Behind the Sun
2016: Here Be Monsters
2017: The Tower
2019: The Crucible
2020: The All Is One
2021: Kingdom of Oblivion
2022  Ancient Astronauts

As Motorpsycho & Friends 
1994: The Tussler - Original Motion Picture Soundtrack

As Motorpsycho & Ståle Storløkken 
2012: The Death Defying Unicorn
2015: En Konsert For Folk Flest

As The International Tussler Society 
2004: Motorpsycho presents The International Tussler Society 
2004: Satans Favourite Son (Promo-single)
2004: Laila Lou (Promo-single)

Live albums (Roadworks) 
1999: Roadwork Vol. 1: Heavy Metall Iz A Poze, Hardt Rock Iz A Laifschteil (Stickman Records), live in Europe 1998
2000: Roadwork Vol. 2: The Motor Source Massacre (Stickman Records), with The Source & Deathprod live at Kongsberg Jazzfestival 1995
2008: Roadwork Vol. 3: The Four Norsemen of the Apocalypse (included in the double DVD release "Haircuts")
2011: Roadwork Vol. 4: Intrepid Skronk
2011: Strings of Stroop – Motorpsycho Live at Effenaar (limited edition vinyl)
2018: Roadwork Vol. 5: Field Notes - The Fantastic Expedition of Järmyr, Ryan, Sæther & Lo (Rune Grammofon), live in Europe 2017

Collaborations 
1993: Into The Sun (Split 7"/CD-single with Hedge Hog)
2001: Go To California (Split-EP with The Soundtrack of Our Lives)
2003: In the Fishtank 10 (Mini-album with Jaga Jazzist Horns)
2005: Det Beste Til Meg Og Mine Venner (JEPS, Big Dipper Records), a tribute to Joachim Nielsen
2009: Blood From A Stone (Nettwerk), with Hanne Hukkelberg

References

External links 
Den psykedeliske odelsgutten Adresseavisen, 2000-03-17
Bent Sæther Profile at Musikkguiden Groove
As Above, So Below

1969 births
Living people
Norwegian rock bass guitarists
Norwegian male bass guitarists
Norwegian male singers
Norwegian male composers
Musicians from Trondheim
Motorpsycho members